César Joaquim Ferreira Gomes (born 17 April 1996) is a Portuguese footballer who plays for Vitória de Sernache as a midfielder.

Football career
On 3 January 2016, Gomes made his professional debut with Penafiel in a 2015–16 Segunda Liga match against Famalicão.

References

External links

Stats and profile at LPFP 

1996 births
Living people
Footballers from Porto
Portuguese footballers
Association football midfielders
Liga Portugal 2 players
Campeonato de Portugal (league) players
F.C. Penafiel players
C.D. Cinfães players
F.C. Pedras Rubras players
A.R. São Martinho players
G.D. Vitória de Sernache players